Karol Gregorek (born 26 January 1983 in Zwoleń) is a Polish retired footballer who played as a striker.

Career

Club
He was released from GKS Bełchatów on 4 July 2011.

In August 2011, he joined Chojniczanka Chojnice.

References

External links
 

1983 births
Living people
Polish footballers
Amica Wronki players
Arka Gdynia players
Lech Poznań players
Wisła Płock players
MKS Cracovia (football) players
GKS Bełchatów players
People from Zwoleń County
Sportspeople from Masovian Voivodeship
Association football forwards